Norton University (NU; , , UNGEGN:) is a private university in Cambodia registered with the Ministry of Education, Youth and Sport. It was established in 1996. The University was one of the first private Cambodian educational institutions.

Norton university is considered to be the Best IT Education Center in Cambodia years after its establishment, and was chosen by National ICT Development Authority (NiDA), Ministry of Post-Telecommunications (MPTC), International Data Group (IDG) to receive the award in 2010. The university has two campuses both based in Phnom Penh.

Professor Chan Sok Khieng is the current Rector of Norton University, and Professor Un Van Thouen is the current Vice-Rector of Norton University.

Courses

Under Graduates (Bachelor's Degree)

College of Arts, Humanities and Languages

Degree

 Bachelor of Arts, in Teaching English as a Foreign Language
 Bachelor of Arts in English Communication
 Bachelor of Arts in English Interpretation and Translation

College of Sciences

Computer Studies

Degree : Bachelor of Science in Computing Information (BSc).

Course Summary

Civil Engineering

Degree : Bachelor Engineering (BEng)
Structure and Components

Electronics & Electricities

Architecture

Post Graduates (Master's Degree)

References

External links
 The Norton University website

Universities in Cambodia
Education in Phnom Penh